Antillophos adelus is a species of sea snail, a marine gastropod mollusc in the family Nassariidae.

Description

Distribution
This marine species occurs off the Dominican Republic.

References

External links
 Schwengel J.S. (1942). New Floridan marine mollusks. The Nautilus. 56(2): 62-66, pls 3, 6.
 Galindo, L. A.; Puillandre, N.; Utge, J.; Lozouet, P.; Bouchet, P. (2016). The phylogeny and systematics of the Nassariidae revisited (Gastropoda, Buccinoidea). Molecular Phylogenetics and Evolution. 99: 337-353

Nassariidae
Gastropods described in 1942